Lars Green (born 30 November 1944) is a Swedish actor. He has appeared in more than 30 films and television shows since 1970.

Selected filmography
 Jänken (1970)
 Codename Coq Rouge (1989)
 Första Kärleken (1992)
 Svart Lucia (1992)
 Call Girl (2012)

References

External links

1944 births
Living people
20th-century Swedish male actors
21st-century Swedish male actors
Swedish male film actors
Swedish male television actors
Male actors from Stockholm